was a Japanese writer and publisher who was the founder of Kodansha, a leading publishing company. He was the founder and publisher of many well-known newspapers and magazines.

Early life and education
Noma was born in 1878. His father hailed from a samurai family. He was a teacher by profession and following his graduation he worked as a teacher in the Luchu Islands.

Career
Noma established a publishing company, Dainihon Yūbenkai (Japanese: the Great Japanese Oratorical Society), in 1910. The company would be later renamed as Kodansha. The first publication of the company was Yūben, a monthly magazine on public speech.

The nine magazines he started enjoyed high levels of circulations and were very influential on the popular culture of Japan. In addition, they comprised the 75% of the total circulation of all Japanese publications. These publications included Kodan Club, Shōnen Club, Omoshiro Club, Gendai (Japanese: Present Generation), Fujin Club, Shōjo Club and Kingu. The latter was his flagship magazine which was identified with the company. In 1930 he established Hochi Shimbun (Japanese: Intelligence Newspaper) which also became an influential publication.

Personal life and death
Noma's wife was a teacher. He died of heart attack in Tokyo on 18 October 1938.

See also
 Noma Literary Prize

References

External links

19th-century Japanese educators
20th-century Japanese businesspeople
1878 births
1938 deaths
Japanese magazine founders
Japanese company founders